Dr. V. P. Gangadharan (born 1954) is an Indian oncologist, known for his support to poor and needy cancer patients by providing them with subsidised medicines and free counselling through Cochin Cancer Society. He was the former Head of the Department at Regional Cancer Centre, Thiruvananthapuram. He has undergone training at The Royal Marsden Hospital in Sutton, London and George Washington University Hospital in Washington, D.C. He was massively involved in the formation of Cochin Cancer Society in 2004, by coordinating people having experienced the ordeal of either having a cancer patient in their family or being a survivor of the disease. He is known to be as "Saint with Stethoscope"

Personal life

Gangadharan was born to a Textile engineer M.N Padmanabhan Nair and Saraswathi Amma in Coimbatore as the youngest of the four siblings. After graduation, Dr Gangadharan went to Coimbatore to join his father’s flourishing textile business and his lack of business acumen led him to abandon the business.

Awards and recognitions

 Kairali Ananthapuri Award 2012 by Ananthapuri Group, Muscat. This award is meant to recognize the personalities who do outstanding performance in the area of social service
 Basheer Award 2015 instituted by the Qatar-based socio-cultural organisation Pravasi Doha
 NSH Global Harmony Award - 2017 - by NSH Global village harmony, Kuwait

References

1954 births
Living people
Indian oncologists
20th-century Indian medical doctors